Jim Hanna may refer to:

 Jim Hanna (writer), American television comedy writer
 Jim Hanna (actor) (born 1967), American actor
 Jim Hanna (loyalist) (1947–1974), senior member of the Northern Irish loyalist paramilitary organisation, the Ulster Volunteer Force